The Sai Yok bent-toed gecko (Cyrtodactylus saiyok) is a species of gecko that is endemic to western Thailand.

References 

Cyrtodactylus
Reptiles described in 2014